Pavao Ljubičić (4 July 1918 – 1 June 1944) was a Croatian rower. He competed in three events at the 1936 Summer Olympics.

References

1918 births
1944 deaths
Croatian male rowers
Olympic rowers of Yugoslavia
Rowers at the 1936 Summer Olympics
Sportspeople from Šibenik